Pomacea fasciata is a freshwater snail in the Ampullariidae family. It is located in Jamaica, Guadeloupe, and Hispaniola. It lays white eggs.

References 

fasciata
Freshwater snails
Gastropods described in 1805
Fauna of Jamaica
Invertebrates of Guadeloupe
Fauna of Hispaniola